Briannah Donolo, known professionally as Rêve, is a Canadian singer and songwriter, signed with 31 East / Universal Music Canada. Her single "Ctrl + Alt + Del" was certified gold in Canada on February 15, 2022.

Early life
Donolo grew up in Montreal and has enjoyed music since a young age. When she was three years old, she tried matching the notes from a real piano on her Fisher-Price toy piano. Her father is Italian.

She first gained attention for singing both the American and Canadian national anthems before a Boston Bruins-Montreal Canadiens hockey game on November 13, 2014. Her performance caused a "buzz" on social media, mostly due to her good looks and giving the American anthem a pop sound. She was contacted by TMZ after the video of her performance earned 100,000 views on YouTube.

She later sang both national anthems at a Toronto Blue Jays exhibition baseball game at Montreal Olympic Stadium in 2016, causing a similar buzz in the media.

Donolo later moved to Toronto to try and gain a foothold in the music industry. She speaks both English and French.

Career
Signed with 31 East / Universal Music Canada, Rêve first gained a following performing on mashups with original lyrics on TikTok. In July 2021, her major-label debut single, "Still Dancing", was released on Astralwerks. She wrote it with Sara Diamond and Banx & Ranx. Her second single "Skin 2 Skin" was released in August 2021. It uses a sample from the band Chicago that is also featured in the 1995 dance song "The Bomb! (These Sounds Fall into My Mind)" by The Bucketheads.

Her single "Ctrl + Alt + Del" was released on September 19, 2021, and was produced by Banx & Ranx, who also co-wrote the song with her. "Ctrl + Alt + Del" charted on the Canadian Hot 100 for 29 weeks, peaking at number 38. It is also featured in the video game FIFA 22, and was later certified platinum in Canada. She hopes to release a full-length album in 2023. Her single "Layover" was released on February 25, 2022.

She received a Juno Award nomination for Breakthrough Artist of the Year at the Juno Awards of 2023.

In 2023, she participated in an all-star recording of Serena Ryder's single "What I Wouldn't Do", which was released as a charity single to benefit Kids Help Phone's Feel Out Loud campaign for youth mental health.

Influences
In an interview with MTV UK, Rêve said: "They are ever-changing, but my 'staple' musical influences are Kaytranada, Robyn, Rufus du Sol, Madonna and SG Lewis."

Awards and nominations

Discography

Extended plays

Singles

Appears on
 "Mornin'" (Rainer + Grimm with Rêve)
 "Lying Awake" (Rainer + Grimm with Rêve)
 "U&U" (Merk & Kremont feat. Rêve & Tim North)
 "Through The Night" (Robin M with Rêve)
 "Let Me Down" (Arigato Massaï feat. Rêve)

References

Living people
1996 births
Canadian women pop singers
Canadian women singer-songwriters
Singers from Montreal
21st-century Canadian women singers
Canadian people of Italian descent
Juno Award for Dance Recording of the Year winners